Saudi Arabia–Tunisia relations refers to the bilateral relations between Saudi Arabia and Tunisia.

The two countries share historical commons but right now they are so Different , Saudi Arabia and Tunisia have political differences. Saudi Arabia is an absolute monarchy while Tunisia is a democratic republic. However, two countries have engaged in larger cooperations

Saudi Arabia has an embassy in Tunis, whilst Tunisia maintains embassy in Riyadh and a consulate in Jeddah.

Historical
The Arab conquest at 7th century had brought Tunisia into an Islamic sphere. A mosque, which is regarded as the fourth holiest place in the Islamic world, the Great Mosque of Kairouan, was built in Tunisia.

Modern relations

Both two nations have increased significant cooperation since the independence of Tunisia from France. The Saudi Kingdom has attempted to increase their Islamic doctrine into Tunisia for several years recently.

After the Tunisian Revolution in 2011, which ousted President Zine El Abidine Ben Ali, Saudi Arabia has granted asylum for Zine Ben Ali, who himself is a long time friend for the Saudis, while supports Tunisia on their track of recovery. Nonetheless, new Tunisian Government has shown unhappiness towards Saudi Arabia's decision to grant Ben Ali's asylum and has demanded the Saudi Government to extradite back to Tunisia for trials.

However, Tunisia's relations with Saudi Arabia started to get strained with the ascend of Mohammed Bin Salman as Saudi Crown Prince, as Saudi Arabia was hostile toward the Arab Spring, which started in Tunisia. In November 2018, on a trip to Tunisia, Mohammed Bin Salman was greeted by protests from locals in the wake of the murder of Jamal Khashoggi.

In 2019 and in the framework of the Arab League summit, King Salman bin Abdulaziz visited Tunisia as a response to the invitation of President Essebsi.

See also 
 Foreign relations of Saudi Arabia 
 Foreign relations of Tunisia

References

External links
Embassy of the Kingdom of Saudi Arabia in the Republic of Tunisia

 
Tunisia
Bilateral relations of Tunisia